Yu Zhengsheng (born 5 April 1945) is a retired Chinese politician. Between 2013 and 2018, he served as the Chairman of the Chinese People's Political Consultative Conference (CPPCC), a largely ceremonial political advisory body. Between 2012 and 2017, Yu was a member of the Politburo Standing Committee of the Chinese Communist Party. 

Prior to coming to prominence nationally, Yu served as the Communist Party Secretary of Hubei, and Party Secretary of Shanghai, one of China's most important regional offices. Yu became a member of the Politburo of the Chinese Communist Party in November 2002.

Career 
Yu Zhengsheng was born in the communist revolutionary heartland of Yan'an in 1945, the son of Yu Qiwei (better known as Huang Jing), a Communist revolutionary, and Fan Jin, a frontline journalist. Yu's family was originally from Shaoxing, Zhejiang province. He graduated from Harbin Military Academy of Engineering specializing in the design of automated missiles. In December 1968 he was sent to work in Zhangjiakou, Hebei. Until the mid-1980s his career concentration was in electronic engineering. In 1984, he was asked by Deng Xiaoping's son Deng Pufang to take on a leading role in the Fund for Disabled Persons. 

In 1985, Yu was sent to Shandong to become Deputy Party Secretary of Yantai in Shandong province. In 1987 he was named mayor of Yantai at age 42. In 1992, he was named party chief of Qingdao and a member of the Shandong provincial Party Standing Committee; he was known to have released his salary income, housing situation, and gifts he received on television. 

He failed to secure election to the Central Committee in 1992, subsequently being sent to become Party chief in Qingdao. Qingdao was approved as a sub-provincial city in 1997. Yu served as Deputy Minister of Construction when he was recalled back to Beijing in 1997, and a year later promoted to the Minister position. He remained in that position in Zhu Rongji's cabinet from 1998 to 2001. He became a member of the powerful Politburo of the Chinese Communist Party in November 2002, while serving as the party chief of Hubei. Yu was the only Hubei party chief since economic reforms began to hold a seat on the Politburo.

Shanghai
Following the 17th Party Congress, Yu became the party chief in Shanghai, replacing Xi Jinping.  During his term as party chief, Shanghai experienced below-normal economic growth and a drastic increase in real estate prices; a large influx of migrants from outside the city migrated in search of work, creating tension with locals. In five urban districts of Shanghai, the population of those with outside hukou exceeded that of long-term Shanghai residents. In addition, the major fire of 15 November 2010 of a 28-storey high-rise apartment also led to some residents citing mismanagement on the part of Yu.

Standing Committee
Prior to the 18th Party Congress, Yu was seen as a leading candidate for the Politburo Standing Committee. It was customary for Shanghai party chiefs to enter the Standing Committee after the end of their terms since Jiang Zemin ascended to the Standing Committee in 1989 (the only exception was Chen Liangyu, who was ousted on corruption charges). It was said that Yu edged out Li Yuanchao for membership on the leadership council at the eleventh hour due to internal voting and consultations. Yu ranked fourth on the Standing Committee, taking on the portfolio of managing Xinjiang and Tibet affairs in addition to becoming the Chairman of the Chinese People's Political Consultative Conference, a largely ceremonial political advisory body.

Personal life 
Yu is married to Zhang Zhikai, the daughter of Zhang Zhenhuan. They have a son. Yu was said to be friends with former leader Deng Xiaoping and his family, including Deng Xiaoping's son Deng Pufang. After the senior Deng left politics, Yu was said to have served as his family's proxy within the Chinese government. He is known to speak without relying on script, and is often called "Lao Yu" by people familiar with him.

Brother's defection 
Yu's brother, Yu Qiangsheng, defected to the United States in 1985. After defecting, Qiangsheng informed the U.S. government that Larry Wu-Tai Chin, a retired CIA analyst, was actually a spy for the Chinese government. According to rumors reported by The Times of London, Yu Qiangsheng was assassinated by Chinese secret agents in Latin America after his defection and placement in witness protection.

References

External links 

  Biography of Yu Zhengsheng at xinhuanet.com

1945 births
Living people
Regional leaders in the People's Republic of China
People's Republic of China politicians from Zhejiang
Chinese Communist Party politicians from Zhejiang
Politicians from Shaoxing
Political office-holders in Hubei
Political office-holders in Shanghai
Members of the 18th Politburo Standing Committee of the Chinese Communist Party
Members of the 17th Politburo of the Chinese Communist Party
Members of the 16th Politburo of the Chinese Communist Party
Government ministers of the People's Republic of China
Chairpersons of the National Committee of the Chinese People's Political Consultative Conference
Beijing No. 4 High School alumni
Mayors of Qingdao
Secretaries of the Communist Party Shanghai Committee